STS-111 was a space shuttle mission to the International Space Station (ISS) flown by Space Shuttle Endeavour. STS-111 resupplied the station and replaced the Expedition 4 crew with the Expedition 5 crew. It was launched on 5 June 2002, from Kennedy Space Center, Florida.

Crew

Mission highlights

STS-111, in addition to providing supplies, rotated the crews aboard the International Space Station, exchanging the three Expedition 4 members (1 Russian, 2 American) for the three Expedition 5 members (2 Russian, 1 American).

The Multi-Purpose Logistics Module (MPLM) carried experiment racks and three stowage and resupply racks to the station. The mission also installed a component of the Canadarm2 called the Mobile Base System (MBS) to the Mobile Transporter (MT) (which was installed during STS-110); This was the second component of the Canadian Mobile Servicing System, or MSS. This gave the mechanical arm the capability to "inchworm" from the U.S. Lab fixture to the MBS and travel along the Truss to work sites.

STS-111 was the last flight of a CNES astronaut, the French agency having disbanded its astronaut group and transferred them to the ESA.

Spacewalks

Media

See also

List of human spaceflights
List of International Space Station spacewalks
List of Space Shuttle missions
List of spacewalks and moonwalks 1965–1999
Outline of space science

References

External links

 NASA mission archive
 NASA mission summary 
 Status reports – Detailed NASA status reports for each day of the mission.
 STS-111 Video Highlights 

Space Shuttle missions
Edwards Air Force Base
Spacecraft launched in 2002
Articles containing video clips